The 2018 Women's Under 18 Australian Championships was a field hockey tournament held in the Tasmanian city of Launceston from 13–21 March.

NSW State won the gold medal, defeating WA 3–2 in the final. QLD Maroon won the bronze medal by defeating VIC 6–1 in the third place playoff.

Teams

 ACT
 NSW Blue
 NSW State
 NT
 QLD Gold
 QLD Maroon
 SA
 TAS
 VIC
 WA

Results

Preliminary round

Pool A

Pool B

Classification round

Fifth to tenth place classification

Ninth and tenth place

Seventh and eighth place

Fifth and sixth place

First to fourth place classification

Semi-finals

Third and fourth place

Final

Statistics

Final standings

References

External links

2018
2018 in Australian women's field hockey